John C. Stout (born September 15, 1983) is an American former professional stock car racing driver and current team owner of SQR Development, which fields one part-time Toyota Supra in the NASCAR Xfinity Series. As a driver, he competed part-time in the Xfinity Series (then known as the Nationwide Series), the NASCAR Camping World Truck Series, and the ARCA Menards Series East (then known as the NASCAR K&N Pro Series East) between 2003 and 2013.

Racing career

Stout began racing karts in western New York at age 11. After winning track championships, he moved up to Super Trucks (which is a class of late model chassis with truck bodies) at age 15 and won track championships. He then began racing late model stock cars at age 18 throughout western New York and Pennsylvania. He then competed part-time in the NASCAR Truck Series from 2003 to 2010, the Nationwide (now Xfinity) Series from 2008 to 2010, and the K&N Pro Series East (now the ARCA Menards Series East) in 2013. On December 20, 2021, Stout announced his return to NASCAR, restarting his Xfinity Series team which last competed in the series in 2009 after buying some Toyotas from Joe Gibbs Racing. The team name was previously Stellar Quest Racing and will now be SQR Development. The team will run 10 to 12 races with the first one being at Richmond. The driver has yet to be determined.

Political career
Stout is a candidate for Governor of New York in the 2022 election. The details about his campaign, including which political party's nomination he is running for (or if he is running as an independent), are unclear.

Personal life
On January 2, 2022, Stout was arrested for repeatedly harassing his wife. On April 2, 2022, he was charged with criminal contempt of court for violating an order of protection.

Motorsports career results

NASCAR
(key) (Bold – Pole position awarded by qualifying time. Italics – Pole position earned by points standings or practice time. * – Most laps led.)

Nationwide Series

Camping World Truck Series

K&N Pro Series East

References

External links
 

1983 births
NASCAR drivers
Living people
Racing drivers from New York (state)
People from Castile, New York